"Only the good die young" is an English proverb, and it may also refer to:

 "Only the Good Die Young", a 1977 song by Billy Joel
 "No-One but You (Only the Good Die Young)", a 1997 song by Queen
 "Only the Good Die Young", a 2008 song by Def Leppard from Songs from the Sparkle Lounge
 "Only the Good Die Young", a 1988 song by Iron Maiden from Seventh Son of a Seventh Son

See also
 No Good Deed (disambiguation)
 Nice guys finish last